Aspergillus costiformis is a species of fungus in the genus Aspergillus. It is from the Aspergillus section. The species was first described in 1995. It has been reported to produce auroglaucin, dihydroauroglaucin, echinulins, epiheveadrides, flavoglaucin, isoechinulins, neoechinulins, physcion, and tetrahydroauroglaucin.

References 

costiformis
Fungi described in 1995